Franck Eric Tientcheu (born 12 November 1996) is a Cameroonian professional footballer who plays as a midfielder for Greek Super League 2 club Ionikos.

Career
Following a youthful spell in the Kadji Sports Academy, he played for domestic Dragon Cljub before signing for Tunisian first-tier club ES Métlaoui. After playing the spring season of the 2017–18 Tunisian Ligue Professionnelle 1 he signed for Greece's Sparta.

References

1996 births
Living people
Cameroonian footballers
Association football midfielders
Kadji Sports Academy players
ES Métlaoui players
A.E. Sparta P.A.E. players
Ionikos F.C. players
Tunisian Ligue Professionnelle 1 players
Football League (Greece) players
Cameroonian expatriate footballers
Expatriate footballers in Tunisia
Expatriate footballers in Greece
Cameroonian expatriate sportspeople in Tunisia
Cameroonian expatriate sportspeople in Greece